She Past Away is a Turkish post-punk band, formed in 2006. The band was formed in Bursa by Volkan Caner (the vocalist and guitarist) and İdris Akbulut (Bass guitar). The band is known for their dark wave musical style with post-punk roots and the gothic image of the band members.

In December 2018, in an interview with an independent music webmagazine, Doruk Öztürkcan announced the release of a new album in 2019 and a subsequent US tour.

On May 31, 2019 they digitally released their third album "Disko Anksiyete", based mainly on disco sounds, but which does not abandon the typical sound of the duo.

Formation and History
She Past Away was formed in Bursa, Turkey in 2006. They released their first EP Kasvetli Kutlama in 2010 with the collaboration of Doruk "Süpermatik" Öztürkcan. They released their first album Belirdi Gece in 2012 by the Athens-based record company, Fabrika Records, which had been working with other new dark wave acts such as Lebanon Hanover.

In 2015, bass guitarist İdris Akbulut left the band and Doruk Öztürkcan, the producer of the band, joined as the keyboard player.

Musical style

The band has a post-punk, new wave and gothic rock sound, inspired by musical acts such as The Sisters of Mercy, Asylum Party, Death in June, Xymox, DAF, Siouxsie and the Banshees of the 1980s. First records of She Past Away had more electronic sound, they later switched to a more guitar and bass-focused style. Their style was also compared to other old acts such as Joy Division, Depeche Mode, Bauhaus and Suicide.

The members explained that erotic horror movies had also inspired their dark aesthetics.

Band members
Current members
Volkan Caner – vocals, guitars (2006–present)
Doruk Öztürkcan – keyboards, drum machine (2015–present), production (2009–present)

Former members
İdris Akbulut – bass (2006–2015)

Discography

Studio albums
Belirdi Gece (2012) Remoov / Fabrika Records
Narin Yalnızlık (2015) Remoov / Fabrika Records 
Disko Anksiyete (2019) Remoov / Metropolis Records / Fabrika Records

Remix albums 

 X (2020) Metropolis / Fabrika Records

EP
Kasvetli Kutlama (2010) Remoov

Single 
 Excess (2021) Blood Music, with Perturbator

References

External links

2006 establishments in Turkey
Metropolis Records artists
Musical duos
Musical groups established in 2006
Turkish rock music groups
Post-punk music groups
Gothic rock groups
Dark wave musical groups